Heimar de Fátima Marin is a nurse and a full professor at the Federal University of São Paulo (UNIFESP).

Career
In 2004 she was elected international member at the American College of Medical Informatics. Heimar Marin was also the president of Brazilian Society of Health Informatics (2002–2008); vice-chair and elected chair (2009–2012) of the International Medical Informatics Association Nursing Informatics Special Interest Group (IMIA NI SIG).

Professor Marin holds a position as visiting professor at Decision Systems Group at Harvard Medical School. She has over 250 publications. As a professor, she has mentored over 30 Ph.D. students, 40 master students, and 120 specialists in health and nursing informatics. Marin is a graduate of Nursing and has a master's degree and doctoral degree in health informatics at UNIFESP. She is “Livre-Docente” at the São Paulo Medical School, State University of São Paulo (FM-USP).  In 2006, she became Full Professor and Director of the Graduate Program in Health Informatics at Federal University of São Paulo (UNIFESP). She was a fellow in Clinical Computing at the Center for Clinical Computing at Harvard Medical School. Dr Marin is currently the Editor-in-Chief of the International Journal of Medical Informatics (Elsevier), Alumni Professor at UNIFESP, Consultant for WHO-EURO and Hospital Alemão Oswaldo Cruz. She is also the Scientific Coordinator of the ICT in Health Research for the Brazilian Network Information Center (NIC.BR).

Publications

Books

Journal articles
 Google Scholar publications
 Medline (Pubmed) publications

References

Year of birth missing (living people)
Health informaticians
Harvard Medical School faculty
Living people
Brazilian nurses
Place of birth missing (living people)